Sù (宿) is a Chinese surname. It was listed 266th among the Hundred Family Surnames.

Notable people
 Su Maozhen (宿茂臻 1972, in Qingdao, Shandong) Chinese football coach
 Su Bai (宿白 1922 – 2018) Chinese archaeologist and bibliographer

See also
 Suzhou, Anhui (宿州), city associated with the surname 

Individual Chinese surnames